The New Parliament Building in St. George's, Grenada is the home of the Parliament of Grenada. It was built to replace York House, the previous Parliament building, which was destroyed by Hurricane Ivan in 2004. The new building is situated on Mount Wheldale, overlooking the city of St. George's and its bay.

The new building cost U.S.$ 12.2m, including funding provided by Mexico and the United Arab Emirates, and was designed by the Grenadian company COCOA Architecture. The building was officially opened in June 2018.

References 

Government buildings in Grenada
Buildings and structures in St. George's, Grenada
2018 establishments in Grenada
Seats of national legislatures